Avitellina is a genus of tapeworms belonging to the family Anoplocephalidae.

Species:

Avitellina bangaonensis 
Avitellina centripunctata 
Avitellina hircusae 
Avitellina pygargi

References

Cestoda